Swallow is an album by bassist Steve Swallow released on the Xtra Watt label in 1992.

Reception

Allmusic awarded the album 4 stars and the review by  Michael G. Nastos states: "All nine cuts were written by this premier electric bass guitarist and performed by a sextet with guests".

Track listing
All compositions by Steve Swallow.
 "Belles" - 3:59
 "Soca Symphony" - 8:02
 "Slender Thread" - 5:45
 "Thrills and Spills" - 4:07
 "William and Mary" - 5:49
 "Doin' It Slow" - 7:30 Bonus track on CD
 "Thirty Five" - 5:48
 "Ballroom" - 5:13
 "Playing with Water" - 4:21

Personnel
Steve Swallow - bass guitar
Steve Kuhn - piano
Carla Bley - organ
Karen Mantler - synthesizer, harmonica
Hiram Bullock, John Scofield - guitar
Gary Burton  vibraphone
Robby Ameen - drums
Don Alias - percussion

References

Steve Swallow albums
1992 albums